This is the complete Chapter and Colony Roll of Phi Sigma, an Honor society for Biological Sciences.

List of Phi Sigma chapters

References

Phi Sigma